Jindong District is an administrative district in Jinhua, Zhejiang Province of China. 

Located in central Zhejiang Province, it borders Yiwu City to the east, Yongkang City to the south, and Wucheng District to the west.

Administrative divisions
Subdistricts:
Duohu Subdistrict (多湖街道), Dongxiao Subdistrict (东孝街道)

Towns:
Xiaoshun (孝顺镇), Fucun (傅村镇), Caozhai (曹宅镇), Lipu (澧浦镇), Lingxia (岭下镇), Jiangdong (江东镇), Tangya (塘雅镇), Chisong (赤松镇)

The only township is Yuandong Township (源东乡)

References 

Districts of Zhejiang
Geography of Jinhua